Phil Harrison is a vice president and general manager for Google, and the former corporate vice president of Microsoft. Previously, Phil was the British corporate executive and a representative director of Sony Computer Entertainment, Inc. (SCEI) and Executive Vice President of Sony Computer Entertainment Europe (SCEE). At E3 in 2005 he showcased the first public realtime demonstrations of PlayStation 3 development hardware. On 3 March 2008, Infogrames Entertainment SA announced Harrison was their new President and Directeur Général Délégué. On 29 May 2009, it was announced that Harrison had become the non-executive director of Atari, formerly Infogrames Entertainment SA.

Background
From 1989 to 1992, Harrison served as head of development for Mindscape International, and prior to that as a game designer and graphic artist in the UK.

Sony

After joining Sony in 1992, Harrison held executive management positions in Europe and North America – where he served as vice president, 3rd Party Relations and Research and Development for Sony Computer Entertainment America from 1996 to 2000. He was a core member of the teams that successfully launched the first three PlayStation consoles and software, that have helped expand the market for computer entertainment worldwide. A 1995 article in Next Generation called Harrison "Sony Computer Entertainment's European PlayStation primary evangelist."

In September 2005, Sony Computer Entertainment unified its regional product development operations under a global structure, Sony Computer Entertainment Worldwide Studios (SCE WWS), and appointed Harrison to serve as President of the new organization. Working closely with Sony's studios in Japan, Europe and North America, Harrison was responsible for setting the global product strategy and managing development operations of 13 studios in Japan, UK (including Evolution Studios), the Netherlands (Guerrilla Games) and the USA.

On 25 February 2008, Sony announced Harrison's resignation from the company effective 29 February.

Infogrames / Atari
On 3 March 2008, Infogrames Entertainment SA announced Phil Harrison as their new Directeur Général Délégué. Later that year he gave interviews in which he predicted that single-player games were to become increasingly rare as consumers wanted "network connectivity" and "community". On 29 May 2009, it was announced that Harrison had become the non-executive director of Atari, following the company's shift to a US-based publishing company, and the renaming of Infogrames Entertainment SA to Atari.

On 19 April 2010, Atari announced Phil Harrison had resigned from the company's Board of Directors.

Gaikai
On 17 May 2010, it was announced that Phil Harrison has joined the advisory board at David Perry's cloud gaming service known as Gaikai.

Microsoft
On 13 March 2012, it was announced that Phil Harrison had joined the Interactive Entertainment Team at Microsoft.

On 17 April 2015, it was announced that Phil Harrison had left Microsoft Game Studios.

Google

On 22 January 2018, it was announced that Phil Harrison had joined Google as a vice president and general manager.

On 19 March 2019, Sundar Pichai announced the launch of the cloud gaming platform Google Stadia, with Harrison as product manager.

On 1 February 2021, Phil Harrison announced that Google would shut down its internal game development studio.

On 29 September 2022, Phil Harrison announced that Google would shut down Stadia entirely by 18 January 2023.

References 

Year of birth missing (living people)
Businesspeople in software
Google people
Living people
Microsoft employees
Sony Interactive Entertainment people
Video game businesspeople